Archibald David Constable (24 February 1774 – 21 July 1827) was a Scottish publisher, bookseller and stationer.

Life
Constable was born at Carnbee, Fife, son of the land steward to the Earl of Kellie.

In 1788 Archibald was apprenticed to Peter Hill, an Edinburgh bookseller, but in 1795 he started in business for himself as a dealer in rare books. He bought the rights to publish the Scots Magazine in 1801, and John Leyden, the orientalist, became its editor. In 1800 Constable began the Farmer's Magazine, and in November 1802 he issued the first number of the Edinburgh Review, under the nominal editorship of Sydney Smith; Lord Jeffrey, was, however, the guiding spirit of the review, having as his associates Lord Brougham, Sir Walter Scott, Henry Hallam, John Playfair and afterwards Lord Macaulay.

Constable made a new departure in publishing by the generosity of his terms to authors. Writers for the Edinburgh Review were paid at an unprecedented rate, and Constable offered Scott 1000 guineas in advance for Marmion. In 1804 A.G. Hunter joined Constable as partner, bringing considerable capital into the firm, styled from that time Archibald Constable & Co. In 1805, jointly with Longman & Co., Constable published Scott's Lay of the Last Minstrel, and in 1807 Marmion. He also published four of James Hogg's books, The Mountain Bard (1807), The Shepherd's Guide (1807), The Forest Minstrel (1810) and Poetical Works (1822).

In 1808 a split took place between Constable and Sir Walter Scott, who transferred his business to the publishing firm of John Ballantyne & Co., for which he supplied most of the capital. In 1813, however, a reconciliation took place. Ballantyne was in difficulties, and Constable again became Scott's publisher, a condition being that the firm of John Ballantyne & Co. should be wound up at an early date, though Scott retained his interest in the printing business of James Ballantyne & Co.

In 1808 he served as Moderator of the High Constables of Edinburgh.

In 1812 Constable, who had admitted Robert Cathcart and Robert Cadell as partners on Hunter's retirement, purchased the copyright of the Encyclopædia Britannica, adding the supplement (6 vols, 1816-1824) to the 4th, 5th and 6th editions. In 1814 he bought the copyright of Waverley. This was issued anonymously; but in a short time 12,000 copies were disposed of, Scott's other novels following in quick succession.  The firm also published the Annual Register.

Through over-speculation, complications arose, and in 1826 a crash came. Constable's London agents stopped payment, and he failed for over £250,000, while James Ballantyne & Co. also went bankrupt for nearly £90,000. Sir Walter Scott was affected by the failure of both firms.

Constable started business afresh, and began in 1827 Constable's Miscellany of Original and Selected Works consisting of a series of original works, and of standard books republished in a cheap form, thus making one of the earliest and most famous attempts to popularize high-quality literature.

Constable died at home, 3 Park Place in Edinburgh, on 21 July 1827, but his firm survived, and the Constable publishing business continued in the twentieth century, issuing a wide range of fiction and non-fiction books. It continues today as Constable & Robinson.

Park Place was a small square north of George Square which was demolished later in the 19th century to build the new medical buildings for Edinburgh University.

Family
Constable was married to Mary Willison. They lived in Craigcrook House in western Edinburgh. Among their children were a son, Thomas, and a daughter, Elizabeth.

Their son, Thomas Constable FRSE (1812-1881) took over his printing business on his father's death. In 1839 he was appointed printer and publisher in Edinburgh to Queen Victoria, and issued, among other notable series, Constable's Educational Series, and Constable's Foreign Miscellany.

Thomas married Lucia Anne Cowan, daughter of Alexander Cowan, an Edinburgh paper-maker (who clearly would have had business links with a major publishing firm such as Constables). They lived at 11 Thistle Street in Edinburgh's First New Town. Their son was also Archibald David Constable FRSE LLD (1843-1915), named after his grandfather, and followed in the family tradition as a printer. In 1865 he became a partner in the firm, and when Thomas retired in 1893 the firm continued under the name of T. & A. Constable.

Their daughter, Elizabeth Constable (d.1818) married his junior publishing partner, Robert Cadell of Ratho.

Publications

In fiction
The character John Paterson ('the Bishop') in John Paterson's Mare, James Hogg's allegorical satire on the Edinburgh publishing scene first published in the Newcastle Magazine in 1825, is based on Archibald Constable.

See also
Archibald Fullarton
George Washington Bacon
Moubray House

Notes

References

Attribution:

Further reading

			
Published by Constable & Co.
  (6 volumes)

Encyclopædia Britannica
1774 births
1827 deaths
Scottish magazine publishers (people)
British magazine founders
People from Fife
Scottish publishers (people)
Burials at Old Calton Burial Ground
Scottish booksellers
Fellows of the Royal Society of Edinburgh
Scottish encyclopedists
Scottish printers
People educated at Edinburgh Academy
Alumni of the University of St Andrews
Humboldt University of Berlin alumni
University of Paris alumni
19th-century Scottish businesspeople
19th-century British newspaper publishers (people)
British expatriates in France